Not Tonight Henry is a 1960 American film. It was one of the first American "nudie cutie" films along with The Immoral Mr. Teas and Eve and the Handyman. It cost $71,000, was filmed over nine days and featured Hank Henry.

References

External links
Not Tonight Henry at IMDb
Not Tonight Henry at BFI
Not Tonight Henry at TCMDB
Complete film at Internet Archive

1960 films
1960 comedy films
American comedy films
1960s American films